The French Syndicate of Cinema Critics has, each year since 1946, awarded a prize ("Prix de la critique", English: "Critics Prize"), the Prix Méliès, to the best French film of the preceding year. More awards have been added over time: the Prix Léon Moussinac for the best foreign film, added in 1967; the Prix Novaïs-Texeira for the best short film, added in 1999; prizes for the best first French and best first foreign films, added in 2001 and 2014, respectively; etc.

Each year, the Syndicate also organizes the International Critics' Week, which is the oldest parallel competitive section of the Cannes Film Festival.

Best French Film

1940s 
1946: La Bataille du rail by René Clément
1947: Le Silence est d'or by René Clair
1948: Paris 1900 by Nicole Védrès
1949: Manon by Henri-Georges Clouzot

1950s 
1950: Rendezvous in July (Rendez-vous de juillet) by Jacques Becker
1951: Diary of a Country Priest (Journal d'un curé de campagne) by Robert Bresson
1952: Les Belles de nuit by René Clair
1953: The Wages of Fear (Le salaire de la peur) by Henri-Georges Clouzot
1954: The Red and the Black (Le rouge et le noir) by Claude Autant-Lara
1955: Rififi by Jules Dassin
1956: The Silent World (Le monde du silence) by Jacques-Yves Cousteau and Les Grandes Manœuvres by René Clair
1957: La Traversée de Paris by Claude Autant-Lara and A Man Escaped by Robert Bresson
1958: Mon Oncle by Jacques Tati
1959: Hiroshima mon amour by Alain Resnais and The 400 Blows by François Truffaut

1960s 
1960: Le Trou by Jacques Becker and A bout de souffle by Jean-Luc Godard
1961: Last Year at Marienbad by Alain Resnais
1962: Cléo from 5 to 7 (Cléo de 5 à 7) by Agnès Varda
1963: The Trial by Orson Welles
1964: The Umbrellas of Cherbourg (Les parapluies de Cherbourg) by Jacques Demy
1965: The Shameless Old Lady (La vieille dame indigne) by René Allio
1966: The War Is Over (La guerre est finie) by Alain Resnais and Au Hasard Balthazar by Robert Bresson
1967: Belle de Jour by Luis Buñuel and Mouchette by Robert Bresson
1968: Stolen Kisses (Baisers volés) by François Truffaut
1969: My Night at Maud's (Ma nuit chez Maud) by Éric Rohmer

1970s 
1970: The Wild Child (L'enfant sauvage) by François Truffaut
1971: Claire's Knee (Le genou de Claire) by Éric Rohmer
1972: The Discreet Charm of the Bourgeoisie (Le charme discret de la bourgeoisie) by Luis Buñuel
1973: Day for Night (La nuit américaine) by François Truffaut
1974: Lacombe Lucien by Louis Malle
1975: Let Joy Reign Supreme (Que la fête commence) by Bertrand Tavernier
1976: The Story of Adele H. (L'histoire de Adèle H.) by François Truffaut
1977: Providence by Alain Resnais
1978: Le dossier 51 by Michel Deville
1979: Perceval le Gallois by Éric Rohmer

1980s 
1980: My American Uncle (Mon oncle d'Amérique) by Alain Resnais
1981: Coup de Torchon by Bertrand Tavernier and Garde à Vue by Claude Miller
1982: A Room in Town (Une chambre en ville) by Jacques Demy
1983: Pauline at the Beach (Pauline à la plage) by Éric Rohmer
1984: Full Moon in Paris (Les nuits de la pleine lune) by Éric Rohmer
1985: Death in a French Garden (Péril en la demeure) à by Michel Deville and Sans toit ni loi by Agnès Varda
1986: Thérèse by Alain Cavalier
1987: Goodbye, Children (Au revoir les enfants) by Louis Malle
1988: The Little Thief (La petite voleuse) by Claude Miller
1989: Mr. Hire (Monsieur Hire) by Patrice Leconte

1990s 
1990: La Discrète by Christian Vincent
1991: The Beautiful Troublemake (La belle noiseuse) by Jacques Rivette
1992: A Heart in Winter (Un cœur en hiver) by Claude Sautet
1993: Smoking/No Smoking by Alain Resnais
1994: Three Colors: Red (Trois couleurs: Rouge) by Krzysztof Kieślowski
1995: Nelly and Monsieur Arnaud (Nelly & Monsieur Arnaud) by Claude Sautet
1996: Capitaine Conan by Bertrand Tavernier
1997: Same Old Song (On connaît la chanson) by Alain Resnais
1998: The Dreamlife of Angels (La vie rêvée des anges) by Erick Zonca
1999: Sachs' Disease (La maladie de Sachs) by Michel Deville

2000s 
2000: The Gleaners and I (Les glaneurs et la glaneuse) by Agnès Varda
2001: Amélie (Le fabuleux destin d'Amélie Poulain) by Jean-Pierre Jeunet
2002: To Be and to Have (Être et avoir) by Nicolas Philibert
2003: La trilogie Un couple épatant, Après la vie and Cavale by Lucas Belvaux
2004: Kings and Queen (Rois et reine) by Arnaud Desplechin
2005: The Beat That My Heart Skipped (De battre mon coeur s'est arrêté) by Jacques Audiard
2006: Private Fears in Public Places (Cœurs), by Alain Resnais
2007: The Secret of the Grain (La graine et le mulet) by Abdel Kechiche
2008: The Beaches of Agnès (Les Plages d'Agnès) by Agnès Varda
2009: A Prophet by Jacques Audiard

2010s 
2010: Of Gods and Men by Xavier Beauvois
2011: The Minister by Pierre Schöller
2012: Amour by Michael Haneke
2013: Blue Is the Warmest Colour by Abdellatif Kechiche
2014: Timbuktu by Abderrahmane Sissako
2015: Fatima by Phillipe Faucon
2016: Elle by Paul Verhoeven
2017: 120 Beats per Minute by Robin Campillo
2018: Mektoub, My Love: Canto Uno by Abdellatif Kechiche

Best Foreign Film

1960s 
1968: Blowup (Italy) by Michelangelo Antonioni
1969: Csillagosok, katonák (Hungary) by Miklós Jancsó

1970s 
1970: Rosemary's Baby (USA) by Roman Polanski
1971: Andrey Rublyov (Soviet Union) by Andrei Tarkovsky
1972: Death in Venice (Italy) by Luchino Visconti
1973: Roma (Italy) by Federico Fellini
1974: Family Life (UK) by Ken Loach
1975: Amarcord (Italy) by Federico Fellini
1976: Aguirre, the Wrath of God (West Germany) by Werner Herzog
1977: Cría cuervos (Spain) by Carlos Saura
1978: Dersu Uzala (Soviet Union) by Akira Kurosawa
1979: The Tree of Wooden Clogs (Italy) by Ermanno Olmi

1980s 
1980: Not awarded
1981: The Elephant Man (USA) by David Lynch
1982: Christ Stopped at Eboli (Italy) by Francesco Rosi
1983: The Night of the Shooting Stars (Italy) by Paolo and Vittorio Taviani and Yol (Turkey) by Yılmaz Güney and Serif Gören
1984: Fanny and Alexander (Sweden) by Ingmar Bergman
1985: Paris, Texas (West Germany) by Wim Wenders
1986: The Purple Rose of Cairo (USA) by Woody Allen
1987: Hannah and Her Sisters (USA) by Woody Allen
1988: Wings of Desire (West Germany) by Wim Wenders
1989: The Dead (USA) by John Huston and Bagdad Café (West Germany) by Percy Adlon

1990s 
1990: A Short Film About Killing (Poland) by Krzysztof Kieślowski
1991: Dekalog (Poland) by Krzysztof Kieślowski
1992: The Double Life of Véronique (Poland) by Krzysztof Kieślowski
1993: Man Bites Dog (Belgium) by Rémy Belvaux, André Bonzel and Benoît Poelvoorde and The Story of Qiu Ju (China) by Zhang Yimou
1994: Raining Stones (UK) by Ken Loach
1995: Exotica (Canada) by Atom Egoyan
1996: Land and Freedom (UK) by Ken Loach and Ulysses' Gaze (Greece) by Theodoros Angelopoulos
1997: Secrets & Lies (UK) by Mike Leigh
1998: Hana-bi (Japan) by Takeshi Kitano
1999: Life Is Beautiful (Italy) by Roberto Benigni

2000s 
2000: Eyes Wide Shut (UK/USA) by Stanley Kubrick
2001: Yi Yi (Taiwan) by Edward Yang
2002: No Man's Land (Bosnia-Herzegovina) by Danis Tanović
2003: Talk to Her (Spain) by Pedro Almodóvar
2004: Elephant (USA) by Gus Van Sant
2005: Lost in Translation (USA) by Sofia Coppola
2006: A History of Violence (USA) by David Cronenberg
2007: Volver (Spain) by Pedro Almodóvar
2008: The Lives of Others (Germany) by Florian Henckel von Donnersmarck
2009: There Will Be Blood (USA) by Paul Thomas Anderson

2010s 
2010: The White Ribbon (Austria) by Michael Haneke
2011: Another Year (UK) by Mike Leigh
2012: Melancholia (Denmark) by Lars von Trier
2013: A Touch of Sin (China) by Jia Zhangke
2014: Winter Sleep (Turkey) by Nuri Bilge Ceylan
2015: Son of Saul (Hungary) by László Nemes
2016: Aquarius (Brazil) by Kleber Mendonça Filho

Best First French Film

2000s 
2001: Ressources humaines by Laurent Cantet
2002: De l'histoire ancienne by Orso Miret
2003: Se souvenir des belles choses by Zabou Breitman
2004: Since Otar Left by Julie Bertucelli
2005: Brodeuses by Éléonore Faucher
2006: Little Jerusalem by Karin Albou
2007: Le Pressentiment by Jean-Pierre Darroussin
2008: Persepolis by Marjane Satrapi and Vincent Paronnaud
2009: Adieu Gary by Nassim Amaouche

2010s 
2010: Belle Épine by Rebecca Zlotowski
2011: Angel & Tony by Alix Delaporte
2012: Louise Wimmer by Cyril Mennegun
2013: Me, Myself and Mum by Guillaume Gallienne
2014: Love at First Fight by Thomas Cailley
2015: The Wakhan Front by Clément Cogitore
2016: Dark Inclusion by Arthur Harari

Best First Foreign Film 
2014: Harmony Lessons (Kazakhstan & Germany) by Emir Baigazin
2015: Titli (India) by Kanu Behl
2016: Dogs (Romania) by Bogdan Mirică

Best Short Film 
 1984 : Coup de feu by Magali Clément
 1999 : Les Aveugles by Jean-Luc Perréard
 2000 : Ressources humaines by Laurent Cantet
 2001 : Soufflé by Delphine Coulin
 2002 : Intimisto by Licia Eminenti
 2003 : Nosferatu Tango by Zoltán Horváth
 2004 : Anna, 3 kilos 2 by Laurette Polmanss
 2005 : Sous mon lit by Jihane Chouaib
 2006 : Stricteternum by Julien Legrand

External links 
French Syndicate of Cinema Critics at IMDb
 Official Website 

French film awards
Awards established in 1946
1946 establishments in France
Film critics associations
Film organizations in France
Non-profit organizations based in France